Marlboro is the name of several places in the state of New Jersey in the United States of America:

Marlboro Township, New Jersey, in Monmouth County
The community of Marlboro, Monmouth County, New Jersey
Marlboro, Burlington County, New Jersey
Marlboro (CDP), New Jersey, in Cumberland County